Kester Winston "Smitty" Smith is an American percussionist. Born in Granada and raised from a young age in Trinidad, He is the drummer for the Taj Mahal Trio and has collaborated with jazz, blues and world musicians. He has performed with and alongside Taj Mahal for over forty years. He has recorded music with Taj Mahal, Geoff Muldaur, Peter Rowan, Cedella Booker, Morgan Freeman, Ellen McIlwaine, Mary Coughlan and Pinetop Perkins.

Selected discography

Taj Mahal, Mo' Roots, Columbia Records, 1974. 
 Taj Mahalm Music Fuh Ya' (Musica Para Tu)
Taj Mahal, Big Blues: Live at Ronnie Scott, Silverline Records, 1991 
Taj Mahal, Mule Bone, Gramavision, 1991 
Geoff Muldaur, Secret Handshake, HighTone Records, 1998 
Taj Mahal, Sugar Mama Blues, Just a Memory Records, 2004 
Taj Mahal, Maestro, Telarc, 2008

References

American percussionists
American drummers
Living people
Year of birth missing (living people)